Chavimochic Special Project is an irrigation system that extends throughout much of the coast of the La Libertad Region, on the north coast of Peru. It was started in the 1960s by the National Development Institute (INADE), a Peruvian central government dependence. In 2003, was made the transfer of the administration to Regional Government of La Libertad.

Origin of the Name
Chavimochic is an acronym formed by the first syllables or graphemes of the names of the four valleys that cross the Madre Canal of the project, these are: Chao, Viru, Moche and Chicama.

The third stage
In 2012, It has been managing the construction of the third and final stage of CHAVIMOCHIC to irrigate land Chicama Valley, north of Trujillo. This stage includes more extensive and fertile region of La Libertad and therefore demand an investment of approximately U.S. $ 825 million, to be financed by the Regional Government and the private sector. Its implementation will be a major step in the development of the La Libertad region, and also it will enhance the economic strength that has taken the region in the last decade.

See also
La Libertad Region
Valley of Moche
Viru Valley
Chicama Valley
Chao Valley

References

External links
Location Chavimochic Project (Wikimapia)
Chavimochic web site

Buildings and structures in La Libertad Region
Irrigation in Peru